The Colonial Intendant of San Salvador was a political position created in 1786 to govern the Intendancy of San Salvador, modern-day El Salvador, that was a part of the Captaincy General of Guatemala, which itself was a part of the Viceroyalty of New Spain, a Spanish colony. The position was abolished on 21 September 1821 with the independence of Central America.

List of Colonial Intendants

See also 

President of El Salvador
President of the Federal Republic of Central America

References

Bibliography 

Politics of El Salvador